Khaled Mahdi (born February 1, 1987) is a Palestinian footballer currently playing for Al-Am'ary of the West Bank Premier League. He started every game of Palestine's 2012 AFC Challenge Cup qualification he has also appeared in three 2014 World Cup qualifiers.

References

1987 births
Living people
Palestinian footballers
Palestine international footballers
Markaz Shabab Al-Am'ari players
West Bank Premier League players
Footballers at the 2014 Asian Games
Association football defenders
Asian Games competitors for Palestine